The 1997–98 Mighty Ducks of Anaheim season was the fifth season in franchise history. The Ducks finished sixth in the Pacific and missed the playoffs.

Off-season

Even though improving and making the Playoffs into the second round getting swept by the Detroit Red Wings, the Mighty Ducks fired Head Coach Ron Wilson on May 20, 1997 replacing him with former Flames Head Coach Pierre Page. Former Coyotes Head Coach Don Hay was hired as an assistant coach.

During the summer only a few changes were made, since the team underwent changes before the trading deadline in March. The Mighty Ducks signed veteran Tomas Sandstrom on August 2 and acquired Scott Young from the Colorado Avalanche for a 1998 3rd round draft pick on September 17, 1997. Brent Severyn joined the Ducks as a free agent from Colorado.
Ruslan Salei earned a regular roster spot on the team. Rookies Matt Cullen, Jeremy Stevenson, Jeff Nielsen and Pavel Trnka also joined the Mighty Ducks.

The Mighty Duck unveiled two alternate jerseys for the their 5th anniversary season : one mainly white, the other mainly green.

Regular season

The Mighty Ducks and Vancouver Canucks made NHL history, being the first teams ever to play a regular season game outside the USA or Canada, facing each other back to back in Tokyo splitting the series.

The season would prove to be a roller coaster ride : many players dressed for the team through the first twenty games as the lines looked different almost every night. On November 24, 1997, Shawn Antowski was involved in a serious car accident which left him with a compressed skull fracture. They also started the season without Paul Kariya due to a contract dispute, but played well without him as the Ducks were 11-12-6 until December 2, 1997, but by then the team was on a downturn going 3-10-2 since November 10 until Kariya returned on December 12, 1997. That night had everybody excited as the Ducks came back from being down 3–0 and Kariya scored two goals and an assist helping the Ducks to win after going winless in their last 6 games for the second time.

Despite his great performance the Mighty Ducks continued to struggle going 4-10-2 by January 14, 1998. Having a week off, the Mighty Ducks looked to bounce back starting a nice run with a 8–3 win against the Florida Panthers going 4-2-1 in their next seven games. On February 1, 1998 hopes of a turnaround in the second half of the season were shattered as Kariya was cross-checked in the head by Gary Suter resulting in Kariya missing the remainder of the season, playing only 22 games. In hopes of adding some more scoring due to Kariya's injury the Ducks acquired Travis Green along with Doug Houda and Tony Tuzzolino in exchange for J.J. Daigeneault, Joe Sacco and Mark Janssens on February 6, 1998.
The team lost seven games in a row in early March but made a push for the post season in late March being undefeated in five games after the team came together following the infamous game against Dallas on March 13, but without their captain and losing Guy Hebert on March 8 due to a severe shoulder injury the team went 7-15-4 after the Olympic break thus missing the Play Offs.

Mikhail Shtalenkov played very well replacing Hebert, appearing in 18 of the last 21 games of the season. It was the first time he was the Mighty Ducks' number one for a longer stretch since playing three games in last year's Play Offs. The Ducks allowed too many goals that season and scored 40 less than last year. The drastic decrease in goals was a result of Kariya's absence, players like Sandstrom, Young, Rycchel, Pronger and Drury scoring less as well as the trade with the Islanders: it saw them losing reliable bottom six scoring from all players, the speed from Sacco, the gritty play of Janssens and the experience of Daigeneault on Defense who was important to their Powerplay. Though Travis Green played quite well for the Ducks, the deal was very lopsided and had many wondered at the time as the deal did not pay off at all. Late season acquisition Josef Marha had Anaheim hoping for next season as he had the most impact after the trading deadline. Several prospects also dressed for the Mighty Ducks showing a lot of scoring talent such as Cullen, Nielsen and especially late season call-up Banham but none them made an impact that was needed. Their Defense got some young blood as well with Salei and Trnka fulfilling management expectations.

The Mighty Ducks were shut out a league high 11 times, tied with the Chicago Blackhawks and the Tampa Bay Lightning.

Final standings

Schedule and results

Player statistics

Regular season
Scoring

Goaltending

Awards and records
Teemu Selanne set the franchise record for most goals in one season with 52 goals. The former record was held by Teemu Selanne and it was set the previous year.

Transactions

Traded Darren VanImpe to the Boston Bruins on November, 1997

Traded Bobby Dollas to the Edmonton Oilers for Drew Bannister on January 9, 1998

Traded J.J. Daigneault, Joe Sacco and Mark Janssens to the New York Islanders for Travis Green Doug Houda and Tony Tuzzolino on February 6, 1998.

Acquired Jamie Pushor from the Detroit Red Wings for Dimitri Mironov on March 24, 1998.

Traded Sean Pronger to the Pittsburgh Penguins in exchange for Patrick Lalime on March 24, 1998.

Traded Warren Rychel to the Colorado Avelanche in exchange for Josef Marha on March 24, 1998.

Draft picks
Anaheim's draft picks at the 1997 NHL Entry Draft held at the Civic Arena in Pittsburgh, Pennsylvania.

Farm teams
Cincinnati Mighty Ducks

See also 
1997–98 NHL season

References

Anaheim Ducks seasons
Anaheim Ducks season, 1997-98
Anaheim
Mighty Ducks of Anaheim
Mighty Ducks of Anaheim